Philibert Vrau (b. at Lille, 19 November 1829; d. there, 16 May 1905) was a French businessman, lay Roman Catholic activist, and Christian socialist.

Life
His father was a manufacturer of sewing thread; his mother, Sophie Aubineau, was a Parisian. He attended the municipal college of Lille. His teacher, a pupil of Victor Cousin, inspired him with an enthusiasm for philosophy.

He gave up the practice of his Catholic religion for four years. During this time he was active in a purely philanthropic society for the aged poor. After his conversion in 1854 he turned this into a religious society. 

Philibert then had to retrieve heavy financial losses of the family firm. With his brother-in-law, the physician Dr. Camille Féron-Vrau (1831–1908), he established religious and beneficial societies for the working people, planned model dwellings for them, and also organized a society of employers and employees. They insisted on the right of the labourer to a living wage. 

Féron-Vrau was arrested in 1892 for allowing a religious element in the association of employers and employees of which he was president, and it was dissolved by law, but was soon revived under another name. Philibert Vrau was sentenced to a month's imprisonment and a fine for allowing some Sisters of Providence, in secular dress, to continue their superintendence of the women in his factory, a charge which they had begun in 1876.

Nocturnal adoration of the Blessed Sacrament was introduced into Lille by Philibert Vrau in 1857. He was largely instrumental in establishing Eucharistic Congresses; the first congress was held at Lille. His nephew, Paul Féron-Vrau, took over in 1900 the Assumptionist imprint "la Bonne Presse",  for Catholic works.

References

Attribution
 The entry cites:
BAUNARD, Les deux freres, Philibert Vrau, Camille Feron-Vrau (Paris, 1911); 
, Philibert Vrau et les oeuvres de Lille (2nd ed., Paris, 1907);
A Modern Saint in Catholic World (August, 1909).

External links
The website of Philibert Vrau (french) at philibert-vrau.com
Documents and bibliography (french) at philibert-vrau.com
Holy cards and prayers (english) at philibert-vrau.com
Holy cards and prayers (spanish) at philibert-vrau.com
Le commis voyageur de Dieu (french book), X. Théry, free of rights

1829 births
1905 deaths
French Roman Catholics